The  is a temple of the Chinese Goddess Mazu located in Yokohama, Japan. It opened on 17 March 2006. It is located in Yokohama's Chinatown.

See also
 Qianliyan & Shunfeng'er
 List of Mazu temples around the world
 Grand Matsu Temple
 Tokyo Mazu Temple

References

External links
 . & 

Buildings and structures in Yokohama
Mazu temples
Taoist temples in Japan
21st-century Taoist temples
Buildings and structures completed in 2006
2006 establishments in Japan